The Dui Hua Foundation, or Dui Hua, is a San Francisco-based nonprofit humanitarian organization that seeks clemency and better treatment for at-risk detainees through the promotion of universally recognized human rights in a well informed, mutually respectful dialogue with China. Focusing on political and religious prisoners, juvenile justice, women in prison, and criminal justice and death penalty reform, Dui Hua's work rests on the premise that positive change is realized through constructive relationships and exchange.

Background 

Dui Hua was founded in April 1999 by John Kamm, a former businessman who also serves as the organization's chairman and executive director. Strong relationships built during his time as a businessman and senior officer of the American Chamber of Commerce in Hong Kong helped Kamm build a mutually respectful human rights dialogue with Chinese officials, judges, and legal experts. Having intervened independently on behalf of political and religious prisoners in China since 1990, Kamm founded Dui Hua in an effort to raise public awareness about human rights issues in China and supplement his advocacy work with expert exchange, research, publications, and community engagement.The Dui Hua Foundation has offices located in San Francisco and Hong Kong. 
	
Inheriting Kamm's close relations with the Chinese government, Dui Hua has also forged partnerships with officials from the European Union, the United States, Norway, Switzerland, Denmark, Australia, Sweden, the Netherlands and other countries that hold human rights dialogues and consultations with China. Dui Hua's staff frequently travels to Europe, China, and Hong Kong to further strengthen its political partnerships and advocacy efforts and remain engaged in the international human rights community.

The Dui Hua Foundation has offices located in San Francisco and Hong Kong.

Special Consultative Status with the United Nations Economic and Social Council 

In 2005, Dui Hua was granted "special consultative status" with the United Nations Economic and Social Council (ECOSOC), allowing Dui Hua staff to attend meetings of the ECOSOC and related bodies and submit statements and reports. Dui Hua is the only independent, overseas nongovernmental organization focused on China's human rights that holds this status. With its consultative status, Dui Hua has participated in UN sessions including the Human Rights Council and Universal Periodic Review and collaborates with UN Special Procedures mandated Working Group on Arbitrary Detention, Working Group on Enforced or Involuntary Disappearances and the Special Rapporteur on Torture, among others.

Programs 

Dui Hua seeks clemency and better treatment for at-risk detainees in China through the promotion of universally recognized human rights in a well-informed, mutually respectful dialogue with China (link to mission statement on website). The foundation focuses specifically on political and religious prisoners, juvenile justice, women in prison, and criminal justice and death penalty reform.

Political and religious prisoners
Dui Hua's prisoner-advocacy work began as an effort to uncover the names and secure the early release of activists imprisoned during the massacre of the pro-democracy demonstrators on June 4, 1989 in Tiananmen Square. Over the years, Dui Hua's scope has broadened to encompass research and advocacy relevant to individuals detained in China for the non-violent expression of their freedom of speech and association.

Dui Hua maintains a secure Political Prisoner Database with information on more than 35,000 political and religious prisoners incarcerated in China since 1980. (Though most would have been released and are not currently serving prison sentences.) Dui Hua researchers use mostly open-source materials in libraries and on the Internet, Dui Hua collects information on political dissidents, religious practitioners, ethnic minorities, and petitioners who have been convicted of non-violent crimes of speech and association.

Dui Hua  directly advocates for individual prisoners by preparing lists of political and religious prisoners believed to be incarcerated in China. Drawing on its prisoner database and years of experience in the selection and presentation of cases, Dui Hua produces many lists each year to be delivered to the Chinese government either directly or through countries and organizations that hold human rights dialogues with China. As a vehicle for expressing concern about individual cases, the lists have directly contributed to better treatment and early release for hundreds of prisoners.

Since its formation, Dui Hua has helped many political and religious prisoners earn sentence reductions, paroles, and early releases. They include Ngawang Sangdrol, Jigme Sangpo, Xue Feng, Dr. Xu Zerong, Professor Chen Taihe, and Sandy Phan-Gillis.  In an interview with Hong Kong's Open Magazine in 2011, Dr. Xu talked about his transfer to a better prison and improved overall treatment and said, "All of this was the result of Kamm's negotiations with the authorities."  Dui Hua was active in uncovering and releasing information about the Yahoo! Internet cases of Chinese journalist Shi Tao and three other dissidents including Wang Xiaoning.

Juvenile justice

Dui Hua is believed to be the first foreign NGO to host a juvenile justice expert exchange with China's Supreme People's Court (SPC) and since 2008, Dui Hua has hosted four such exchanges. In 2008, Dui Hua arranged for a delegation of six Chinese judges to visit US juvenile courts, detention facilities, and other institutions. As a testament to its success, the SPC invited Dui Hua to send a return delegation to China in 2010. In 2012, Dui Hua hosted a delegation from the Supreme People's Court on a week-long study tour in the San Francisco Bay Area. The delegation was made up of SPC judges as well as judges from courts across China. In 2014, Dui Hua was invited to Beijing for an exchange with the SPC; the exchange focused on the importance of record sealing in allowing juveniles more equal access to educational and job opportunities for the future.  These exchanges have contributed to reformative steps in China's juvenile justice system in areas such as record sealing, diversion, and behavioral and psychological assessments of juvenile offenders. Dui Hua's close working relationship with the SPC ensures that future criminal and juvenile justice initiatives will take place, leading to more concrete systemic reforms.

Women in prison

Dui Hua actively promotes reform in the area of women prisoners in China. The organization held an expert-led seminar in Hong Kong on the Bangkok Rules (Rules for the Treatment of Women Prisoners and Non-custodial Measures for Women Offenders) in February 2014. In 2016, Dui Hua partnered with Penal Reform International and translated into Chinese an e-course on sections of Bangkok Rules . Dui Hua also exposes the plight of incarcerated women in China through its research and publications. In February 2016, the foundation published an investigative piece based on extensive and ongoing research on the ever-rising number of women in Chinese prisons. The findings indicate a rise in the female prison population.

Criminal justice

Dui Hua regularly engages in dialogue with both Chinese and international government officials and experts on China's Criminal Law and Criminal Procedure Law (CPL). On November 3, 2011, Kamm testified to the US House Committee on Foreign Affairs on behalf of political prisoners following the release of proposed amendments to the CPL.

Dui Hua has actively promoted death penalty reform in China since 2005. Since 2011, Dui Hua has released what is believed to be the most accurate statistics on the number of yearly executions in China. Dui Hua believes that approximately 4,000 executions took place in China in 2011, down about 50 percent since the Supreme People's Court regained its power of final review over death sentences in 2007. Dui Hua's estimate garnered widespread media coverage and was cited as "rare data" by Agence France-Presse. Since 2009, the foundation has maintained an internal log of death sentences and executions in China. Dui Hua estimated that there had been 2,000 executions in 2016, the figure attracted widespread attention from the media.

Publications 

Dui Hua regularly posts commentary, analysis, and translation about human rights and rule of law in China on its blog, Human Rights Journal.

It also publishes Digest, a monthly newsletter featuring news on human rights issues relevant to the foundation's mission and recent activities. Digest articles cover topics such as bilateral human rights dialogues with China, developments in US-China relations, human rights concerns shared by the United States and China, prisoner updates, and research findings. Dui Hua's Digest also features the series John Kamm Remembers,  where Executive Director John Kamm shares stories from his human rights activism on behalf of political prisoners prior to and since Dui Hua's establishment in 1999.

Reference Materials is an online publication consisting of information on prisoner cases, criminal justice statistics and regulations, and commentaries uncovered by Dui Hua's researchers in open-source publications and documents issued or approved by Chinese government bodies.

Human rights organizations based in the United States
Non-profit organizations based in San Francisco
Human rights in China
Organizations established in 1999
1999 establishments in California